Russian State University of Tourism and Service (RSUTS) is a public university in Russia and CIS countries which provides higher education in tourism and services studies.

The university is based in Pushkino, Moscow Oblast, near Moscow, and has its own campus in Makhachkala.

Originally a higher school of handicraft cooperation, it was founded in 1952.

According to the study in December 2018 by the University of Indonesia in the framework of the international project “World University Ranking”, RSUTS was among the 500 best universities in the world with the most sustainable development. At the end of 2018, the university got into the TOP 50 universities in Russia according to the ranking of Forbes magazine.

Departments

Faculty of Services Studies 
 Department of Appliances
 Department of Information systems
 Department of Safety Technosector and Chemical Technology
 Department of Service Centers and Transportation Services

Faculty of Tourism and Hospitality Management Studies 
 Department of Public Relations
 Department of Restaurant and Hotel Services Organization and Technology
 Department of Tourism Activities Organization and Technology

Faculty of Technology and Design 
 Department of Artistic Design of Object-Spatial Environment
 Department of Sewing and Knitting Products Design and Technology
 Department of Drawing and Painting
 Department of Materials and Product Expertise
 Department of Art and Interior Design Products and Technology

Faculty of Economics 
 Department of Accounting and Taxation Studies
 Department of Corporate Governance and E-Business
 Department of Economics and Business Studies
 Department of Finance
 Department of Labor Economics and HR Management
 Department of Management
 Department of Marketing and Commerce
 Department of State and Municipal Administration

Faculty of Law and Social Communications 
 Department of Civil Law
 Department of Criminal Law
 Department of Psychology and Social Work
 Department of Social Technology
 Department of State and Legal

Universal Departments 
 Department of Economics
 Department of Engineering Mechanics
 Department of Foreign Languages
 Department of History and Political Studies
 Department of Mathematics and IT
 Department of Philosophy and Cultural Studies
 Department of Physical Culture and Sport
 Department of Russian Language and the Culture of Speech
 Department of Science Education
 Department of Sociology and Education

Regional Departments 
 Centre for Accelerated Learning
 Regional Department of Services Studies in Podolsk

Campuses 
 Institute of Services Studies (Moscow Campus)
 Institute of Tourism and Hospitality Management Studies (Moscow Campus)
 Regional Campus in Mahachkala

References

External links 
 
 Yerevan Campus website
Community rgutis.com

Universities in Russia
Educational institutions established in 1952
Tourism in Russia
1952 establishments in the Soviet Union